Prasat is a Khmer and Thai term meaning "castle", "palace", or "temple" (derived from the Sanskrit  / ). It may refer to:

Prasat, towers in Khmer architecture
Prasat (Thai architecture), a royal or religious building form in Thai architecture
Prasat, Preah Netr Preah, a khum (commune) of Preah Netr Preah District, Banteay Meanchey Province, Cambodia
Prasat District, Surin Province, Thailand

See also
 
 Prasad (disambiguation)